Edo State Polytechnic Usen is a higher institution of learning located in Usen community of Ovia South West local government area of Edo State, Nigeria. It was formerly known as Edo State Institute of Technology and Management (ESITM) Usen.

Background 
The polytechnic was founded in 2002 by the former governor of Edo State, Chief (Dr.) Lucky Nosakhare Igbinedion. Governor Godwin Obaseki, in May, 2019, signed a bill into law officially changing the name of the school from Edo State Institute of Technology and Management (ESITM), Usen to Edo State Polytechnic, Usen, as part of reforms to reposition the school for greater impact.

The school runs four schools, with a total of 21 academic programmes. The institution's programmes are accredited by Nigeria's National Board for Technical Education.

The rector, Abiodun Falodun, is a pharmaceutical chemist.

The Webometrics Ranking of World Universities ranked Edo State Polytechnic as second best polytechnic and the 54th best tertiary institution in Nigeria in 2017.

The school had its first convocation ceremony in November, 2018 after over 16 years of existence.

Schools 

 Applied Sciences
 Computer  Science
 Food Science Technology
 Statistics
 Science Laboratory Technology
 Pharmaceutical Technology
 Agricultural Technology
 Library and Information Science
Business Studies
Accounting
Business Administration
Banking and Finance
Marketing
Public Administration
Office Technology and Management
Mass Communication
Engineering
Civil Engineering
Chemical Engineering
Electrical/Electronics Engineering
Mineral and Petroleum Resources Engineering
Production Engineering 
Mechanical Engineering
Wielding and fabrication engineering
Environmental Studies
Estate Management
Building Technology
Urban and Regional Planning
Surveying and Geo-informatics

See also 
 List of polytechnics in Nigeria
 Education in Nigeria

References

External links
 

Educational institutions established in 2002
Education in Edo State
Polytechnics in Nigeria
2002 establishments in Nigeria
Public universities in Nigeria